Zaporizhzhia Oblast, also referred to as Zaporizhzhia, is an oblast (province) in southeast Ukraine. Its administrative center is Zaporizhzhia.

This oblast is an important part of Ukraine's industry and agriculture. Most of the area of the oblast has been under Russian military occupation since the 2022 Russian invasion of Ukraine, including all of the coast, although the capital and the majority of the population remains under Ukrainian administration.

On 30 September 2022 Russia annexed the Donetsk (Donetsk People's Republic), Luhansk (Luhansk People's Republic), Zaporizhzhia, and Kherson Oblasts. However, the referendums and subsequent annexations are internationally unrecognized.

Geography

The area of the oblast is 27,183 km²; its population (estimated as of 1 January 2013) was 1,785,243.

Important cities 
Important cities include:
 Berdiansk (Occupied by Russia)
 Enerhodar – home of the Zaporizhzhia Nuclear Power Plant (Occupied by Russia)
 Melitopol (Occupied by Russia)
 Zaporizhzhia

Relief 
Zaporizhzhia Oblast is characterized by a flat landscape. Soils are mostly chernozem. Knowledge of the relief of the Zaporizhzhia Oblast today is especially important because of the problem of land reclamation and its more intensive use.

The territory of Zaporizhzhia Oblast as a whole has a flat topography, but there are markedly elevated and depressed areas, which differ in shape, origin, and age.

The highest central-eastern part of the oblast is the Azov Upland. It extends to the east and to the territory of Donetsk Oblast, where it meets the Donetsk ridge. In the south, between the Azov Upland and the Sea of Azov, is the western part of the Azov coastal plain, which flows into the Black Sea west of the Molochna River. The northeastern end of the coastal plain merges with the Zaporizhzhia inner plain, which borders the southeastern outskirts of the Dnieper Upland. Thus, the territory of Zaporizhia Oblast consists of two distinct geomorphological parts: the outskirts of the Azov and Dnipro uplands, which structurally correspond to the southeastern part of the Ukrainian crystalline massif and the outskirts of the coastal Priazov and Black Sea plains, which are located within the Black Sea basin.

History
The area corresponding approximately to the modern Zaporizhzhia Oblast—according to Herodotus—was called in antiquity as the land of Gerrhos. This area was the burial place of the kings of the "Royal Scythians".

The modern Zaporizhzhia Oblast was created as part of the Ukrainian Soviet Socialist Republic on 10 January 1939 out of the Dnipropetrovsk Oblast.

During the 1991 Ukrainian independence referendum, 90.66% of votes in the oblast were in favor of the Declaration of Independence of Ukraine.

Russian invasion 

During the 2022 Russian invasion of Ukraine, the Russian armed forces occupied the southern part of the oblast, defeating the Ukrainian armed forces at Melitopol and at Enerhodar. Ukrainian forces conducted an attack that destroyed a Russian ship and damaged two others in the port of Berdiansk.  the northern parts of the oblast, including its capital city, Zaporizhzhia, are controlled by Ukraine.

On 4–5 July 2022 during the international Ukraine Recovery Conference (URC 2022) hosted in Lugano, Switzerland, The Czech Republic, Finland and Sweden pledged to support the rebuilding of Zaporizhzhia region.

On 23–27 September 2022, the Russian Federation held a referendum in the occupied territories of Kherson and Zaporizhzhia oblasts for "independence and subsequent entry into the Russian Federation". These referendums are recognized by most states to be staged and against international law. On 29 September 2022, the Russian Federation recognized Zaporizhzhia Oblast as an independent state. On 30 September, Russian president Vladimir Putin announced the annexation of the Zaporizhzhia Oblast and three other Ukrainian territories, and signed "accession decrees" that are widely considered to be illegal. At that time, Russia was only in control of about 70% of the province as a whole. The United Nations General Assembly subsequently passed a resolution calling on countries not to recognise what it described as an "attempted illegal annexation" and demanded that Russia "immediately, completely and unconditionally withdraw".

Points of interest
The following sites were nominated for the Seven Wonders of Ukraine.
 Kamyana Mohyla, prehistoric "Stone Tomb" site (museum-preserve)
 Khortytsia, island in the River Dnieper
 Dniprostroy hydroelectric power station

Subdivisions

Until the major administrative reforms of 2020, the Zaporizhzhia Oblast was administratively subdivided into 20 raions (districts) as well as 5 cities (municipalities) that are directly subordinate to the oblast government: Berdiansk, Enerhodar, Melitopol, Tokmak, and the administrative center of the oblast, Zaporizhzhia.

Note: Asterisks (*) Although the administrative center of the raion is in the city/town that it is named after, cities do not answer to the raion authorities (only towns do), but are directly subordinated to the oblast government and therefore are not counted as part of raion statistics.

Following the reforms of 2020, the oblast is divided into just five new raions, which incorporate the 5 former city (municipalities) that were directly subordinate to the oblast government:

Demographics

According to the 2001 Ukrainian Census, the population of the oblast was 1,929,171. Some 70.8% considered themselves Ukrainians, while 24.7% were Russians, the rest nationalities were Bulgarians (1.4%), Belarusians (0.7%), and others (1.6%). Almost half the population (48.2%) considered the Russian language their native.

Age structure
 0–14 years: 13.5%  (male 124,285/female 116,613)
 15–64 years: 70.7%  (male 598,849/female 662,838)
 65 years and over: 15.8%  (male 91,051/female 190,818) (2013 official)

Median age
 total: 41.2 years 
 male: 37.5 years 
 female: 44.8 years  (2013 official)

Fertility

Education 

679 daytime and 11 evening state schools plus 6 daytime schools that are non-budget supported secondary schools involved 271,400 pupils in 2001. 22 classical schools, 8 lyceums, a Sichovy collegium and 54 education-breeding complex bodies aren't out of reach to gifted children. New style 38 complex kindergarten-schools work too.

Over 60,000 children develop their talents through out-of-school institutions. They attend 30 creative centres, 6 science-technical stations and four young naturalists' stations, five tourist clubs, three training flotillas, 11 children's sports clubs and 20 sports schools. The extra-scholastic education system has such a unique body as the Small Academy of Science. Boys and girls work there in six main disciplines: physics-mathematics, chemistry-biology, history-geography, philology, industrial and information technologies. The Small Academy young members maintain close friendly relations with scientists of big institutes and universities. 26 youngsters became winners of the All-Ukrainian Academy contest, so the Zaporizhzhia oblast team gained the 1st place.

325 secondary schools, five classical schools, a collegium, and three comprehensive schools use the Ukrainian language. Nevertheless, the minorities have a free choice—193 schools are Russian, a large Jewish school «Alef» works in Zaporizhzhia and smaller ones exist in other points, a Ukrainian-Bulgarian Lyceum is in Primorsky district. The Greek, Czech, Bulgarian languages are very popular in Yakimivsky, Berdyansky, Priazovsky and Melitopole rural districts. One may learn Hebrew, Yiddish, German, Polish, Tatar and other languages attending option courses anywhere.

Specialists keep on looking for an adaptive school model. 26 institutions develop the humanization process using new teaching technologies. The Khortitsky multi-profile teaching-rehabilitation centre has worked out methods for complete support of sanatorium-boarding-schools' children. Berdiansk is the town where a regional boarding school for orphans works out active socialization programs.

42 institutions provide vocational education. This system distributes well-trained workers to regional industries and businesses. The list of specialties includes over 100 names. Vocational schools give courses for improving qualifications in cooperation with unemployment centres. More than 1,500 jobless persons get new professions every year due to it.

The higher education system is the most flexible and advanced. Today 25 state-controlled technical colleges have I-II class rank and 8 higher institutions have III-IV class certificates. These are the University and the Zaporizhzhia Politechnic, the Medical University and the Institute of Law with Ministry of Internal Affairs in Zaporizhzhia City, the Pedagogical University, the Agricultural Academy in Melitopol and the Pedagogical Institute in Berdiansk. There are also five higher-education private bodies—the Institute of Economics and Information Technologies, the State and Municipal Government Institute and the others. Over 65,000 people are students in this oblast. There are 212 Doctors of Science and 1,420 Candidates of Science among their lecturers. The city of Zaporizhzhia is one of the biggest centres for foreigners' education in Ukraine.

The International Astronomical Union named two minor planets 5936 Khadzhinov and 19082 Vikchernov in honor of Ukrainians from Zaporizhizhia Oblast who made a significant contribution in science and education.

Economics

Gross oblast product (GRP) 
The volume of the gross regional product of the oblast in 2016 amounted to 104,323 million UAH (9th place among the regions). The total contribution of the oblast to the GRP of Ukraine was 4.4%.

The index of the physical volume of gross regional product in the previous year's prices was 99.7%.

The amount of gross value added (GVA) in 2016 amounted to 82,054 million UAH (9th place among the oblasts).

The total contribution of the oblast to the GVA of Ukraine amounted to 4.1% in 2016.

The index of physical volume of gross value added in previous year's prices was 99.8%.

The main types of economic activity that form the GVA of the oblast are:

 industry (including the supply of electricity, gas, steam, and air conditioning): 41%
 agriculture, forestry, and fisheries: 13.9%
 wholesale and retail trade: 10.4%
 real estate transactions: 6%

References

Further reading 
  Запорізька область: Ілюстрована енциклопедія. [Т.2]: Архітектура і містобудування. Культура. Економіка. Райони області / К.С. Карафін, О. І. Красюк. -Запоріжжя : Дике Поле, 2004. - 293 с.

External links
 Specialized investment portal – official website 
 Zaporozhye Regional Tourist Information Centre – official website 
 Zaporizhzhia Oblast Administration – official website 
 Zaporizhzhia Oblast Rada – official website 

 
1939 establishments in Ukraine
Oblasts of Ukraine
States and territories established in 1939
Ukrainian territories claimed by Russia